Julius Tobias (19151999) was an American painter and sculptor, know for creating large minimalist environments. He was a student of Fernand Léger. Works by Tobias are in the collection of the Brooklyn Museum and the Albright-Knox Art Gallery

References

Collections 

1915 births
1999 deaths
20th-century American painters
20th-century American sculptors